Trent Frazier (born September 8, 1998) is an American professional basketball player for Zenit and the VTB United League. He played college basketball for Illinois.

High school career
As a sophomore, Frazier led Wellington High School to an 8A Florida High School Athletic Association basketball state championship, and hit the game-winning free throw with 0.4 seconds left for a 57–56 victory over Hagerty High School. Frazier played under legendary hoops coach and 8A coach of the year, Matt Colin.

During his senior season, Frazier averaged 27.6 points, 6.3 rebounds and 4.4 assists, leading Wellington to a 27–4 record and Florida Class 9A State Semifinals appearance.

Recruiting
After his official visit to Illinois, Frazier verbally committed to the program and former head coach John Groce on August 21, 2016. During his recruitment, Frazier considered offers from Baylor, Maryland, Kansas State, and Seton Hall.

In March 2017, Frazier reaffirmed his decision to play college basketball at Illinois after John Groce was fired and head coach Brad Underwood was hired away from Oklahoma State. Frazier had indicated that both his connections to his future teammates at Illinois and that Underwood had recruited Frazier while he was head coach at Stephen F. Austin were factors in the decision to remain committed to Illinois.

College career
On February 8, 2018, Frazier scored a career high 32 points against Wisconsin at the State Farm Center. Frazier's 32 points were the third most points ever scored by a freshman in a single game in Illinois history, trailing only Deon Thomas and Kiwane Garris who are the first and second all-time leading scorers at Illinois. He also scored 27 points against Iowa, including a buzzer beating three to send the game into overtime. During his freshman season, Frazier led all Big Ten Conference freshman in scoring, assists, steals and three-pointers made per game, earning both conference All-Freshman team honors and Honorable Mention honors. Frazier averaged 12.5 points, 3.1 assists and 1.8 rebounds per game as a true freshman. As a sophomore, he averaged 13.7 points, 2.6 assists and 2.3 rebounds per game. Frazier served in a complementary role to Ayo Dosunmu as a junior, averaging 9.1 points and 1.9 assists per game. During the 2021–22 season Frazier reached the #5 spot on Illini men's basketball career scoring list. He was named to the Second Team All-Big Ten.

Professional career
On June 10, 2022, Frazier signed a contract with Serbian team FMP for the 2022–23 season. On February 2, 2023, Frazier signed a contract with Russian team Zenit for the end of season.

Career statistics

College

|-
| style="text-align:left;"| 2017–18
| style="text-align:left;"| Illinois
| 32 || 16 || 26.3 || .405 || .347 || .644 || 1.8 || 3.1 || 1.7 || .0 || 12.5
|-
| style="text-align:left;"| 2018–19
| style="text-align:left;"| Illinois
| 32 || 30 || 30.5 || .411 || .406 || .759 || 2.3 || 2.6 || 1.4 || .0 || 13.7
|-
| style="text-align:left;"| 2019–20
| style="text-align:left;"| Illinois
| 31 || 30 || 30.5 || .327 || .309 || .853 || 2.2 || 1.9 || .9 || .0 || 9.1
|-
| style="text-align:left;"| 2020–21
| style="text-align:left;"| Illinois
| 31 || 31 || 33.7 || .400 || .362 || .831 || 2.7 || 2.7 || 1.3 || .1 || 10.2
|- class="sortbottom"
| style="text-align:center;" colspan="2"| Career
| 126 || 107 || 30.2 || .389 || .358 || .764 || 2.3 || 2.6 || 1.3 || .0 || 11.4

References

External links
Illinois Fighting Illini bio

1998 births
Living people
ABA League players
African-American basketball players
American expatriate basketball people in Serbia
American men's basketball players
American sportspeople of Puerto Rican descent
Basketball players from Florida
Illinois Fighting Illini men's basketball players
KK FMP players
Point guards
Puerto Rican men's basketball players
21st-century African-American sportspeople